Hajjiabad-e Pas Kuhak (also Romanized as Ḩājjīābād-e Pas Kūhak; also known as Ḩājjīābād) is a village in Qarah Chaman Rural District, Arzhan District, Shiraz County, Fars Province, Iran. At the 2006 census, its population was 32, in 9 families.

References 

Populated places in Shiraz County